Trevor McCallum (born February 26, 1964) is a former English-Canadian soccer defender who played professionally in the North American Soccer League and earned eighteen caps with the Canada men's national soccer team.

Career 
McCallum played with Aston Villa's youth team, and in 1979 he moved to Canada where he played with Mississauga United in 1981. In 1982, he played in the National Soccer League with Toronto Italia. In 1983, he played in the North American Soccer League with Toronto Blizzard in the last two seasons of the league. In 1986, he returned to the National Soccer League and played with former team Toronto Italia. The following season he played in the Canadian Soccer League with the Edmonton Brick Men, but was traded to the Blizzard midway through the season. During his time in the Canadian Soccer League he was selected to the 1989 All-Star team.

In 1990, he was originally transferred to Edmonton, but shortly after was traded to Kitchener Spirit. In 1991, he returned to play with the Toronto Blizzard.

International career 
McCallum made his debut for the Canadian national soccer team on December 6, 1983 against Mexico in a friendly match. In total he played 18 international matches for the national team between 1983 and 1988.

Personal life 
His nephew Gavin McCallum is also a footballer who played for the Canadian national soccer team.

References

External links

1961 births
Living people
Footballers from Birmingham, West Midlands
Canada men's international soccer players
Canadian Soccer League (1987–1992) players
Black Canadian soccer players
Canadian soccer players
English emigrants to Canada
Association football defenders
North American Soccer League (1968–1984) players
Soccer players from Mississauga
Toronto Blizzard (1986–1993) players
Toronto Blizzard (1971–1984) players
Toronto Italia players
Kitchener Spirit players
Canadian National Soccer League players
Hamilton Steelers (1981–1992) players